Philippe Caffieri may refer to:

 Philippe Caffieri (1714–1774), French sculptor
 Philippe Caffieri (1634–1716), Italian decorative sculptor, active mainly in France

See also
 Caffieri family